Madison Valley is a neighborhood in Seattle located east of Capitol Hill; west of Washington Park; south of Montlake; and north of Madrona.

References

External links
 HistoryLink, Seattle Neighborhoods: Madison Valley
 "Capitol Hill Triangle: Madison Valley / Capitol Hill Neighborhood Blog"